Yoros Castle is a ruined castle dating back to Byzantine times that stands above the confluence of the Bosphorus and the Black Sea, to the north of Joshua's Hill, in Beykoz district, Istanbul, Turkey. It is commonly referred to as the Genoese Castle, due to Genoa’s possession of it in the mid-15th century.

Geography 

Yoros Castle sits on a hill surrounded by steep bluffs overlooking the confluence of the Bosphorus and the Black Sea. It is just north of a small fishing village called Anadolu Kavağı, on Macar Bay, and the entire area is referred to as Anadolu Kavağı. The castle overlooks one of the narrowest stretches of the Bosphorus, and on the opposite shore is Rumeli Kavağı, which formerly held a fortification similar to Yoros Castle. (Anadolu and Rumeli were Ottoman terms for the Anatolian and European parts of the empire).

Since 2016 the Third Bosphorus Bridge has been visible from Yoros Castle.

History 
The future site of Yoros Castle was originally settled by the Phoenicians and Greeks for trading and military purposes. The Greeks called the area Hieron (Sacred Place).  The remains of temples, including to Dios, to the Altar of the Twelve Gods, and to Zeus Ourios (Zeus, granter of fair winds) Belonging to the BCE era have been discovered here.

Yoros Castle was intermittently occupied throughout the course of the Byzantine Empire. Under the Palaiologos dynasty in its later years, Yoros Castle was strongly fortified, as was the castle on the opposite side of the Bosphorus. A massive chain could be extended between these two points, cutting the Strait off from enemy warships in the same way that the chain across the Golden Horn was used to defend Constantinople during the last Ottoman siege by Sultan Mehmed II.

The Byzantines, Genoese and Ottomans fought over this castle for centuries. It was first captured by Ottoman forces in 1305, but was retaken by the Byzantines shortly afterwards. Sultan Bayezid I took the castle again in 1391 while preparing for his siege of Constantinople, and it was used as a base during the construction of Anadolu Hisarı, which was to prove more important in the eventual successful siege. In 1399 the Byzantines attempted to take back Yoros Castle. The attack failed, but the village of Anadolu Kavağı was burned to the ground. The Ottomans held the fortress from 1391–1414, losing it to the Genoese in 1414. Their forty-year occupation gave the castle its commonly used nickname -  the Genoese Castle.

After Sultan Mehmed II’s conquest of Constantinople in 1453, the presence of the Genoese in such a strategic location posed a threat to the new Ottoman capital and within a few years they were driven out. Mehmed II then refortified the walls, and constructed a customs office, a quarantine centre and a check point, as well as garrisoning the site. Bayezid II (1481–1512) later added a mosque within the castle walls.

Cossack raids plagued the Ottoman Empire from time to time. In 1624 a fleet of 150 Cossack caiques sailed across the Black Sea to attack Bosphorus towns and villages. Sultan Murad IV (1623–1640) refortified Anadolu Kavağı as a defence against them. This proved instrumental in securing the region against such seaborne raids.

Under Osman III (1754–1757), Yoros Castle was once again refortified.  Later, in 1783 Abdülhamid I added more watchtowers. After this time, the castle gradually fell into disrepair.  By the time the Turkish Republic was declared in 1923, it was no longer in use.

Present day 

The ruins of the citadel and its surrounding walls still exist, although the mosque, most of the towers and other structures have been lost. Greek inscriptions remain carved on the walls o this day, along with the symbol of the Palaiologos family, who ruled Byzantium until its fall.

Yoros Castle and the village of Anadolu Kavağı make a popular day trip from the centre of Istanbul. From 2018 to 2021 excavations were carried out at the castle but it is now open to the public again.  

Much of the area surrounding the castle is in the hands of the Turkish military and closed to visitors.

See also
Rumeli Kavağı
Byzantine Empire
Ottoman Empire

Gallery

References 
Rough Guide to Istanbul.
Summer-Boyd, Hilary, and John Freely. Strolling Through Istanbul.
Istanbul: SEV Matbaacilik ve Yayincilik A.S., 1997

External links

Yoros Castle photo gallery
Drone footage of the castle from July 2022

Castles in Turkey
Ottoman fortifications
Ancient Greek archaeological sites in Turkey
Buildings and structures in Istanbul
Tourist attractions in Istanbul
Bosphorus
Forts in Turkey
Byzantine fortifications in Turkey
Ruined castles in Turkey
Castles in Istanbul Province
World Heritage Tentative List for Turkey